The Miss Missouri Teen USA competition is the pageant that selects the representative for the state of Missouri in the Miss Teen USA pageant. It is directed by Vanbros and Associates, based in Lenexa, Kansas. In 1993, Missouri joined the Vanbros group of state pageants for the Miss USA and Teen USA system.

Missouri is in the top 10 most successful states at Miss Teen USA in terms of number and value of placements. Six Missouri teens have gone on to compete at Miss USA, although only four as Miss Missouri USA. The other two represented Kansas, another Vanbros state.

Two notable Miss Missouri Teen USAs (who both later won the title Miss Missouri USA) are Larissa Meek and Melana Scantlin, who appeared on the reality TV show Average Joe.

Shae Smith of Bolivar was crowned Miss Missouri Teen USA 2022 on May 1, 2022 at The Mansion Theater for the Performing Arts in Branson, Missouri. She will represent Missouri for the title of Miss Teen USA 2022 in the fall of 2022.

Results summary

Placements
Miss Teen USAs: Marissa Whitley (2001), Sophia Dominguez-Heithoff (2017)
2nd runners-up: Audra Shurman (1991)
4th runners-up: Rhonda Hoglan (1985), Sydnee Stottlemyre (2011)
Top 6: Tiffany Meyer (1994), Leah Sexton (1996)
Top 10: Caitlin McIntosh (2000)
Top 12: Tavia Shackles (1990), Melana Scantlin (1995)
Top 15: Alissa Reitmeier (2004), Sierra Drimak (2009), Christina Stratton (2015), Dallas Ezard (2016)
Top 16: Brenda Smith-Lezama (2013)‡, Anna Long (2021)
Missouri holds a record of 16 placements at Miss Teen USA. 

‡ Voted into Top 16 as America's Choice

Awards
Miss Photogenic: Melanie Breedlove (1993), Christina Stratton (2015)
Miss Congeniality: Rachel Woolard (2005)

Winners 

1 Age at the time of the Miss Teen USA pageant

External links
Official website

Missouri
Women in Missouri